Keskil (Sahıl) is a rural locality (a selo), the only inhabited locality, and the administrative center of Sasylsky Rural Okrug in Tomponsky District of the Sakha Republic, Russia, located  from Khandyga, the administrative center of the district. Its population as of the 2010 Census was 555, up from 536 recorded during the 2002 Census.

References

Notes

Sources
Official website of the Sakha Republic. Registry of the Administrative-Territorial Divisions of the Sakha Republic. Tomponsky District. 

Rural localities in Tomponsky District